Tales of the Crusaders is a series of two historical novels by Sir Walter Scott released in 1825: The Betrothed and The Talisman. Set at the time of the Crusades, Tales of the Crusaders is a subset series which forms part of Scott's multi-novel series known as the Waverley Novels released from 1814 to 1832.

References
"Walter Scott." Encyclopædia Americana Thomas, Cowperthwait, & Company, 1838 pg. 279

Walter Scott novel series
1825 British novels
Novels set during the Crusades
Novels set in the 12th century